Snap or SNAP may refer to:

Arts and entertainment
 Snap, the original release title for the 2013 film Enter the Dangerous Mind
Snap (TV series), a CITV programme
 The Stanly News and Press, a newspaper in Albemarle, North Carolina, US

Games and sport
 Snap (gridiron football), the start of a play in gridiron football
 Scalable Network Application Package, an online gaming platform
 Pokémon Snap, a 1999 video game
New Pokémon Snap, the 2021 sequel 
 Snap, any putdown used in the Dozens

Card games
 Snap (card game)
 Strong Notrump After Passing (SNAP), a contract bridge bidding convention

Music
 Snap music, a hip-hop subgenre
 Snap!, a German music group
  Snap! (album), by the Jam, 1983
 "Snap" (Rosa Linn song), 2022
 "Snap", a song by Nav from Bad Habits, 2019
 "Snap", a song by Slipknot from Slipknot, 2009 reissue
 "Snap!", a song from the TV series Boo!

Aviation
 Dallair Aeronautica FR-100 Snap!, an Italian aerobatic aircraft
 Tecnam Snap, an Italian aerobatic aircraft

Computing
 Snap (computer graphics), an aid for positioning an object relative to grid lines or another object
 Snap (web framework), a Web framework written in Haskell
 Snap Server, a computer storage device
 SNAP Points (software non-functional assessment process), a measurement of non-functional software size
 Snap! (programming language), an educational graphical programming language
 ITK-SNAP, a medical imaging software application
 Subnetwork Access Protocol (SNAP), a network link protocol
 Snap (package manager), whose packages are called "Snaps"
 a memory dump, or "snapshot dump", taken "on the fly" to provide a snapshot of the status of a running program or system at a particular moment

Organizations
 Snap (coach company), a demand-responsive coach company in the United Kingdom
 Snap Inc., developer of the Snapchat social media application
 Snapchat, the social media application
 Sarawak National Party (SNAP), a defunct Sarawak-based political party in Malaysia
 Survivors Network of those Abused by Priests, in the United States

Places
 Snap, Kentucky, United States
 Snap, Wiltshire, England, a deserted village

Science
 Snap (physics) or jounce, in physics, the fourth derivative of the position vector concerning time
 S-Nitroso-N-acetylpenicillamine, a chemical compound
 Schedule for Nonadaptive and Adaptive Personality (SNAP), a questionnaire for personality disorder assessment
 Significant New Alternatives Policy, a US EPA ozone-depleting chemicals program
 Supernova/Acceleration Probe, a proposed spacecraft
 Systems for Nuclear Auxiliary Power, experimental electricity generators in the 1960s
 Snap bean, the unripe, young fruit and protective pods of various cultivars of the common bean
 Soluble NSF attachment protein, a family of proteins involved in vesicle membrane binding
 Proteins in the SNAP-receptor (SNARE (protein)) family, including: 
 SNAP23
 SNAP25
 SNAP29
 SNAP91, the gene that codes for clathrin coat assembly protein AP180
 HT-2157, formerly SNAP-37889, a pharmacological antagonist for galanin receptor 3
 SNAP-94847, a pharmacological antagonist for melanin-concentrating hormone receptor 1

Other uses
 Snap (horse), a Thoroughbred racehorse and sire
 Snap (Pillow Pal), a plush toy
 Snap fastener, a clothing fastener
 Snaps, a shot of alcoholic beverage
 Bang snaps or "snappers", a novelty firework
 Bolt snap, a hook with a sliding bolt gate
 Finger snapping, a thrusting of the fingers together that creates a sharp sound
 Supplemental Nutrition Assistance Program, an American federal assistance program (formerly the Food Stamp Program)
 A product mascot, one of Snap, Crackle and Pop
 Snaps, crispy and light potato puffs manufactured under the Smiths brand
 The Snap, a fictional event in the Marvel Cinematic Universe
 Snap election, an election that is called prematurely and earlier than scheduled.

See also
 Snapper (disambiguation)
 Snappy (disambiguation)